Euporie , also known as , is a natural satellite of Jupiter. It was discovered by a team of astronomers from the University of Hawaii led by Scott S. Sheppard in 2001, and given the temporary designation .

Euporie is about 2 kilometres in diameter, and orbits Jupiter at an average distance of 19,088 Mm in 538.780 days, at an inclination of 145° to the ecliptic (145° to Jupiter's equator), in a retrograde direction and with an eccentricity of 0.144.

It was named in August 2003 after Euporie, a Greek goddess of abundance and one of the Horae in Greek mythology (and thus a daughter of Zeus). It is a member of the Ananke group.

References

Ananke group
Moons of Jupiter
Irregular satellites
Discoveries by Scott S. Sheppard
20011211
Moons with a retrograde orbit